The University of California, Davis School of Law (Martin Luther King Jr. Hall), commonly known as King Hall, is the professional graduate law school of the University of California, Davis. The school received ABA approval in 1968.  It joined the Association of American Law Schools (AALS) in 1968.

UC Davis School of Law is the smallest of the five law schools in the University of California system, with a total enrollment of under 600 students. The school is located in a building named for Dr. Martin Luther King Jr., and commonly referred to as King Hall.

Rankings and academics

In 2016, U.S. News & World Report ranked UC Davis 30th among all law schools in the United States.

For diversity among the five law schools in the UC system, UC Davis was named the second-most diverse after UC Hastings by U.S. News & World Report. Princeton Review placed UC Davis Law tenth in the nation for faculty diversity in the 2009 version of its annual law ranking.  It is listed as an "A−" in the March 2011 "Diversity Honor Roll" by The National Jurist: The Magazine for Law Students.

It is listed as an "A" (#16) in the January 2011 "Best Public Interest Law Schools" ratings by The National Jurist: The Magazine for Law Students.

UC Davis Law has the smallest student body of the UC law schools. It has a slightly higher student/faculty ratio than UCLA or Berkeley.

UC Davis has been ranked as the fifth most-expensive public law school in the nation by U.S. News & World Report. It is also ranked first for providing the most financial aid.

UC Davis grants the second-most in financial aid in the country. UC Davis Law's King Hall Loan Repayment Assistance Program (LRAP), founded in 1990 to help alumni working in relatively low-income public-service law careers to repay student loans, was the first loan repayment assistance program established at any UC law school.

According to Brian Leiter's Law School rankings, Davis ranks 23rd in the nation for scholarly impact as measured by total academic citations of tenure-stream faculty.

On November 28, 2022, UC Davis Law withdrew from U.S. News & World Report rankings and will no longer provide data to contribute to those rankings.

Bar passage rates
Based on a 2001-2007 6 year average, 79.4% of UC Davis Law graduates passed the California State Bar exam. In 2009, 89% of first-time test takers passed the California bar.

For July 2012, 78.9% of first-time test takers passed the California bar exam. For July 2013, 85.0% of first-time test takers passed the California Bar Exam.

For July 2014, 86% of first-time test takers passed the California bar exam.

Employment 
According to King Hall's official 2019 ABA-required disclosures, 85% of the Class of 2019 obtained full-time, long-term, JD-required employment nine months after graduation. King Hall's Law School Transparency under-employment score is 6.5%, indicating the percentage of the Class of 2019 unemployed, pursuing an additional degree, or working in a non-professional, short-term, or part-time job nine months after graduation.

Costs
The total cost of attendance (indicating the cost of tuition, fees, and living expenses) at King Hall for the 2013–2014 academic year is $68,346 for California residents and $80,591 for non-residents. The Law School Transparency estimated debt-financed cost of attendance for three years is $265,806 for residents.

Expansion
The law school completed a $30 million expansion project in 2011. The project has added an additional wing to the law school's current building, increasing assignable space by nearly 30 percent to provide for additional classrooms, offices, and a new courtroom, named the Paul and Lydia Kalmanovitz Appellate Courtroom in honor of a $1 million gift to the project from the Kalmanovitz Charitable Foundation.  The courtroom is used by the U.S. Court of Appeals for the Ninth Circuit, California Supreme Court, and California Court of Appeal.

Noted people

Faculty
Alan Brownstein, Boochever and Bird Chair for the Study and Teaching of Freedom and Equality, professor emeritus
Gabriel "Jack" Chin, professor of law, specialist in fields of immigration law and criminal procedure
Joel Dobris, professor of law, scholar of trusts, wills, and estates
Angela P. Harris, professor of law, critical legal theory scholar
Robert W. Hillman, professor of law, fair business practices and investor advocacy chair, professor emeritus
Edward Imwinkelried, Edward L. Barrett Jr. Professor of Law
Kevin Johnson, dean and Mabie-Apallas Professor of Public Interest Law and Chicana/o Studies, specialist in civil rights, immigration, and Chicano/a rights law
Miguel Méndez, professor of law,  evidence law scholar
Terry O'Neill, president, National Organization for Women, acting professor of law 1988–1989.
Rex R. Perschbacher, Daniel J. Dykstra Endowed Chair, lecturer (1981–2016), dean of the law school (1998–2008), professor emeritus (2016–2018). Professor of law, civil procedure, professional responsibility, legal ethics and clinical application of legal education
Cruz Reynoso, associate justice of the California Supreme Court 1982–1987, Professor Emeritus
Martha West, former associate dean; Professor Emeritus
William S. Dodge, professor of law, international law, international transactions, and international dispute resolution.  He currently serves as co-reporter for the American Law Institute's Restatement (Fourth) of Foreign Relations Law: Jurisdiction and as a member of the State Department's Advisory Committee on International Law.

Alumni
Tani Cantil-Sakauye, the 28th and current chief justice of the Supreme Court of California
Craig F. Stowers, associate justice (and formerly the 18th chief justice) of the Supreme Court of Alaska 
Kristina Pickering, associate justice of the Supreme Court of Nevada
Clint Bolick, associate justice of the Supreme Court of Arizona
Kelli Evans, associate justice of the Supreme Court of California
F. Philip Carbullido, associate justice of the Supreme Court of Guam; chief justice 2003-2008
Luis Alejo, California State Assemblymember
Charles Calderon, California State Assemblymember, former majority leader of the California State Senate
Sharon L. Gleason, judge, United States District Court for the District of Alaska
Elihu Harris, former Democratic mayor of Oakland, California
Ryan T. Holte, judge, United States Court of Federal Claims
Paul Igasaki, chief judge and  chair of the U.S. Department of Labor Administrative Review Board; deputy chief executive officer of Equal Justice Works; former chair of the U.S. Equal Employment Opportunity Commission (EEOC), appointed by President Clinton
Gus Lee, American author and ethicist
Laura Liswood, co-founder of the Council of Women World Leaders; senior advisor, Goldman Sachs
George Miller, Democratic congressman; Ranking Member, United States House Committee on Education and Labor
Angela E. Oh, activist, former chair of U.S. Senator Barbara Boxer's Federal Judicial Nominations Committee
Dean D. Pregerson, judge, United States District Court for the Central District of California; son of Judge Harry Pregerson
Jane A. Restani, chief judge, United States Court of International Trade
Jim Rogers, city councilman, City of Richmond, California
Jon Sands, chief federal public defender for the District of Arizona
Anna Slotky, actress
Gary D. Solis, adjunct professor of law, Georgetown University Law Center
Darrell Steinberg, mayor of Sacramento, California State Senate President Pro Tem, (D-Sacramento)
Arthur Torres, California State Senator; former chairman of the California Democratic Party
Monika Kalra Varma, director, Robert F. Kennedy Memorial Center for Human Rights (RFK Center)
Steve White, former presiding judge, Sacramento County Superior Court; former inspector general of the California Department of Corrections and Rehabilitation

References

External links
 

University of California, Davis
California, Davis
Educational institutions established in 1965
Natural resources law
1965 establishments in California